La hija de Moctezuma ("Moctezuma's Daughter") is a 2014 Mexican comedy film directed by Iván Lipkies. It stars María Elena Velasco (as La India María), Eduardo Manzano, Rafael Inclán, Raquel Garza, and Ernesto Pape. This was Maria Elena Velasco's last film played as "La India Maria" before her death.

Synopsis
At the request of her great-grandfather, Moctezuma Xocoyotzin, La India María must find Tezcatlipoca's magical black mirror in order to prevent the destruction of Mexico. A Spanish archaeologist (Alonso), a tricky treasure hunter (Bianchi), and a greedy governor (Brígida Troncoso) all find out about the existence of the black mirror and embark on a frenetic chase to obtain it.

Cast
 María Elena Velasco as La India María
 Eduardo Manzano as Xocoyote
 Rafael Inclán as Moctezuma
 Raquel Garza as Brígida Troncoso
 Ernesto Pape as Alonso
 Irma Dorantes as unidentified character
 Armando Silvestre as unidentified character

Production

Casting
Rafael Inclán had to learn Náhuatl to play Moctezuma.

Actress and singer Irma Dorantes wanted to participate in the film and was given a small part as a secretary.

Release
The film premiered in Mexico on 9 October 2014 with 370 copies distributed by Star Castle Distribution.

Critical response
La hija de Moctezuma received good reviews from critics. Lucero Calderón of Excélsior wrote: "I can only say that if [Mexican] viewers sometimes see scary movies made in Hollywood, why can't they give an opportunity to a well-made film that appeals to the nostalgia of popular cinema and that was done through the efforts and sacrifice of many people."

References

External links
 
 

Mexican comedy films
2014 comedy films
2010s Mexican films